Raorchestes ponmudi is a species of frog in the family Rhacophoridae. It is endemic to the Western Ghats, India and like others in the genus has a life-history that involves direct development, the tadpoles develop into tiny frogs within the egg. Its natural habitat is subtropical or tropical moist montane forests which are threatened habitats. It was first described from Ponmudi hill after which it is named but the species has a wider distribution within the southern Western Ghats and has been recorded in Wynaad, Idukki, and Thiruvananthapuram districts in Kerala, and Valparai in Tamil Nadu. It is a somewhat large species within the genus with males nearly 4 cm long from the tip of the snout to the vent.

References

External links

 AMNH Amphibian Species of the World
 AmphibiaWeb

ponmudi
Frogs of India
Endemic fauna of the Western Ghats
Taxonomy articles created by Polbot
Amphibians described in 2005